Orson Sherman Head (October 9, 1817February 19, 1875) was an American lawyer and Wisconsin pioneer.  He practiced law in Kenosha, Wisconsin, represented Kenosha County for one year in the Wisconsin State Senate (1851), and was district attorney from 1859 through 1861.  His name was often abbreviated in historical texts as O. S. Head.  He was a great-grandfather and namesake of the American screenwriter and filmmaker Orson Welles.

Biography
Orson S. Head was born on October 9, 1817, in Paris, New York. He was raised on his father's farm and worked there throughout his youth along with his five brothers.  He went on to study law in Utica, New York, under Horatio Seymour, who would later become Governor of New York. In 1841, he moved to the Wisconsin Territory, where he was admitted to the bar.  Head settled in Kenosha, Wisconsin, and practiced law.

Known for his flaming red hair and beard, sturdy physique, and forceful personality, Head was elected prosecutor for Kenosha County three times. In 1851 he won a special election to serve one year in the Wisconsin State Senate, filling a vacancy caused by the sudden resignation of Elijah Steele.

Head died of pneumonia February 19, 1875, at his home in Kenosha, Wisconsin.

Personal life and family
Orson S. Head was a descendant of John Alden, a crewmember of the Mayflower, and settler at Plymouth Colony.  Orson was the sixth of seven children born to Jonathan E. Head and Hephzibah Livermore Head.

Orson S. Head was married to Mary Jane Treadwell in 1846, and they had seven children.  After his wife's death in 1863, he remarried with Mary S. Raymond, but had no additional children.  At the time of his death, in 1875, he was survived by five children and his second wife.

His eldest surviving daughter, Mary Blanche, married Richard Jones Wells; their son, Richard Hodgdon Head Welles, was the father of Orson Welles.

References

External links

1817 births
1875 deaths
Deaths from pneumonia in Wisconsin
People from Paris, New York
Politicians from Kenosha, Wisconsin
New York (state) lawyers
Wisconsin lawyers
Wisconsin state senators
American people of English descent
19th-century American politicians
19th-century American lawyers